Bullina is a genus of sea snails or bubble snails, marine gastropod molluscs in the family Aplustridae.

Species 
Species within the genus Bullina include:
Bullina callizona Sakurai & Habe, 1961
Distribution : Philippines
Description : white ovate shell with four narrow pink spiraling bands.
Bullina exquisita McGinty, 1955, the exquisite bubble
Distribution : Indian Ocean
Length : 7.8 mm
Description : found at depths of 90 to 110 m
 Bullina lineata Gray 1825, the red-lined bubble
Distribution : Indo-Pacific, Japan to Australia.
Bullina nobilis Habe, 1950
Distribution : Japan, Philippines
Length : 10–21 mm
Description : ovate shell with wide aperture, narrowing at the top, and white outer lip; shell with horizontally spiraling red-brown bands, crossing wavy vertical bands in the same color, over a white background. Twisted columella.
Bullina oblonga Sowerby, 1893
Distribution : South Africa, Réunion.
Length : 8-11.5 mm
Description : rather rare; almost white shell, crossed by numerous red-brown fine spiraling bands that end at the columella.
Bullina torrei (Aguayo & Rehder, 1936)
Distribution : Cuba, Virgin Islands, Indian Ocean, Arabian Sea, Gulf of Bengal.
Length : 8.5 mm
Description : found at depths of 15 to 27 m
Bullina virgo Habe, 1950
Distribution : Philippines
Length : 8 mm
Description : white shell crossed by two pale pink spiraling bands.
Bullina vitrea Pease, 1860
Distribution : Australia, New Caledonia, Hawaii, Japan
Description : found at depths of 12–15 m; shell with two gray or black spiraling bands and a yellowish color at the anterior and posterior; the snail is translucent clear with white pigmentation.

References 

Aplustridae
Taxa named by André Étienne d'Audebert de Férussac